Rain City Drive is an American post-hardcore band from Sacramento, California, United States, formed in 2014 under the name Slaves.

They released three studio albums, Through Art We Are All Equals on June 24, 2014, Routine Breathing on August 21, 2015 and Beautiful Death on February 16, 2018 with founding member Jonny Craig. Craig departed from the band in 2019 and was replaced by Matt McAndrew, with whom they released their fourth studio album, To Better Days on August 7, 2020. This was their final album to be released under the band name Slaves.

On October 15, 2021, the band announced that they had changed their name to Rain City and signed to independent record label Thriller Records. However, the band later opted to be known as Rain City Drive.

On July 15, 2022, the band released their first studio album under their name self titled "Rain City Drive". The band wrapped up a summer 2022 tour with Memphis May Fire and they are set to hit the road with Set It Off fall 2022. The band is also set to tour the UK with Dance Gavin Dance in January 2023.

History

Formation and Through Art We Are All Equals (2014)
The band members were revealed through lead singer Jonny Craig's Twitter account on January 15. The following day he tweeted that the name of the group would be called Slaves, a name coined by founding drummer Tai Wright.

Craig explained the name Slaves in an article on Ryan's Rock Show. "Men have been enslaving men for as long as we've had gods to hide behind," Craig said. "Every man is a slave to what we love – whether it be women, drugs, music or sports. Through art we are all equals".

On March 3, Alternative Press posted an article stating that Artery Recordings have just signed Craig's band Slaves to their label and are now on their roster. Craig posted a tweet saying that his original record label Rise Records would not be associated with this new band.

The band went on their first US tour in May in direct support of Hands Like Houses, Miss Fortune, and Alive Like Me, in May and June.

Slaves released their first single The Fire Down Below through Artery Recordings on April 22. The album, Through Art We Are All Equals, was produced by Kris Crummett, and was released on June 24, 2014. The album features guest vocals from Kyle Lucas, Tyler Carter of Issues, Vic Fuentes of Pierce The Veil, as well as Jonny Craig's sister, Natalie Craig.
The album's track listing was released in May 2014. The album debuted on No. 53 at official Billboard 200 charts in the U.S.

On May 13, 2014, the band's second single, "the Upgrade Pt. II" (a sequel to his song The Upgrade from his EP Find What You Love And Let It Kill You), was streamed off Artery Recordings' YouTube page. Later that month, on May 29, the band released a lyric video for the third single from the album, "Starving for Friends", which featured Vic Fuentes of Pierce the Veil.

Slaves was revealed to be a supporter on the All Stars Tour. This is Jonny Craig's second time being on the All Stars Tour, the first time being with Dance Gavin Dance which ultimately led to him being kicked out of the band.

On May 30, bassist Jason Mays announced via Facebook that he would not be continuing with Slaves due to family problems and health issues.
 Andrew Mena, formerly of Scarlett O'Hara filled in temporarily and toured with the band for the remaining dates. After Andrew Mena went back to his duties of being a tour manager, Michael Nordeen, an operations manager at Artery Recordings was convinced by Alex Lyman to join the band for a few tours. In the beginning of Winter, 2014, Colin Vieira joined Slaves yet again.

On June 24, 2014, Slaves announced one headlining show in Las Vegas, Nevada on July 9, 2014. In the following days they announced an overseas tour to Australia, along with a headlining tour starting on October 7, with bands such as Nightmares, Myka Relocate, among others.

On July 9, the band's first official music video was released on the Artery Recording's YouTube for the album's fourth and final single, "My Soul Is Empty and Full of White Girls", directed/produced by Jeremy Tremp and Shan Dan.

Routine Breathing and line-up instability (2015–2016)
On January 7, 2015, the band uploaded a picture to their Facebook page claiming that "Slaves has officially started writing their 2nd full length album, get excited!" with the following "#SLAVES2015"

On February 9, guitarist Christopher Kim announced his departure via Twitter. He was replaced with Jonathan Wolfe to fill-in temporarily on tour, though was allegedly "ditched in Texas" by the band just a few days later. The band replaced Wolfe on the road with Weston Richmond.

On June 21, Alex Lyman and Weston Richmond were injured in a knife attack in Sacramento. Also injured was Blake Abbey, lead singer of Musical Charis. Charis stated that the attack was invoked by the three of them wearing skinny jeans.

On July 5, the band tweeted a picture of the track list for Routine Breathing. The track list features 15 songs, with guest vocals from Garret Rapp (The Color Morale), Spencer Chamberlain (Sleepwave and Underoath), Tilian Pearson (Dance Gavin Dance), and Kyle Lucas. 
Also, a 15-second teaser of the song "Burning Our Morals Away" was posted, along with album artwork for Routine Breathing.

On July 9, the debut single from their second album leaked via leak websites across the web. The band then released the single, "Burning Our Morals Away", on July 10. The album was scheduled for an October release date, but was pushed to August 21, 2015. The band was voted off of Vans Warped tour on July 18 after only playing two dates on the tour.  The band cited that they were voted off the tour by the other bands on Warped, fearing that Jonny would begin his drug use again. 
On July 23, the band released the second single from Routine Breathing, "Death Never Let Us Say Goodbye", after the song had leaked. They released the official video for "Burning Our Morals Away" later that week, on July 28. On August 16, the band released the third single from Routine Breathing, "Drowning In My Addiction" with a lyric video.

From March until April 2016, the group is scheduled to tour the United States with Myka Relocate, Capture the Crown, Outline in Color and Conquer Divide.

On March 30, Alex Lyman announced he would be leaving the band after their current tour with Capture The Crown. On April 9, Tai Wright announced his formal departure from the Slaves, citing issues within the band as his reason. On April 10, the band announced their breakup after their last show in Santa Cruz, California.

On May 20, Jonny announced on his Facebook that Slaves did not break up but are going through some difficult times, Jonny and Colin are the only members remaining.

Beautiful Death, Craig's Departure and label change (2017–2019)
On August 11, the band announced their next headlining tour with Outline in Color and Avion Roe while currently writing their third album. On January 20, 2017, the band released the single "I'd Rather See Your Star Explode". 
Their third studio album "Beautiful Death" was initially slated to be released in September 2017, however due to a split with their label and Jonny Craig's recent hospitalization, the band confirmed that a release would be pushed back until January 2018. The band announced the first US headline tour on July 10, titled "The Beautiful Death Tour", with support from Secrets, Picturesque, and Out Came The Wolves. They also said that they would be playing a few new songs from the upcoming third album on the tour, which is scheduled to start 1 September 2017. On November 3, Colin confirmed they were picked up by Warner Brothers.

On November 17, 2017 Artery Recordings announced via Twitter that they were dropping Slaves from the label after Jonny Craig was accused of multiple counts of sexual assault.

On December 21, 2017, the band announced the third studio album will be released on February 16, 2018 through Sony Music label The Orchard. In early January 2018, the band announced a new headlining tour, with support from Kyle Lucas, Dayshell, and Ghost Town, to promote the new album. The tour began in Dallas, TX on the day of the album's release and scheduled to end on March 12, 2018 in Scottsdale, AZ.

The band released their third studio album, Beautiful Death, on February 16, 2018, on SBG Records and The Orchard. On January 24, 2019, the band announced that Jonny Craig was removed from the band citing addiction as the reason of his removal. Jonny Craig issued a response of his own shortly after, explaining that he's looking after his health before returning to music.

Arrival of Matt McAndrew, To Better Days and name change (2020–2021)
The group continued to tour across Europe and Australia with Matt McAndrew replacing Craig as lead vocalist. A music video for "Wasting My Youth" was released on March 28.
On June 25, 2020, the band announced that To Better Days would be their final release under the name Slaves, on a Facebook statement, the band wrote,  As obstinate supporters of the BLM movement, we cannot continue to tie our music and our positive message to a word associated with such negative weight and hurt. The band released their fourth studio album, To Better Days, on August 7, 2020.

On October 15, 2021 members announced that they would continue to release music and perform as Rain City bringing the end to Slaves citing. 

 It was in Manchester, England aka Rainy City, that the five of us met. Our new name – Rain City – is a nod to the serendipity that brought us together and a reminder to keep looking up even when there’s a cloud overhead. We’re so proud to call this thing our own. To our incredible fans, we appreciate you and are forever grateful for your support. This new album is for you. 

On the November 6, 2021 the band announced on their Instagram page that they were again making a change to the bands name to Rain City Drive due to unforeseen circumstances and to avoid future problems. The band released a single Cutting It Close on November 12, 2021.

Band members

Current members
 Colin Vieira – bass (2014, 2015–present)
 Weston Richmond – lead guitar (2016–present), backing vocals (2015–present), rhythm guitar (2015–2016)
 Felipe Sanchez – rhythm guitar, backing vocals (2018–present)
 Zachary Baker – drums (2018–present)
 Matt McAndrew – lead vocals, additional guitar (2019–present)

Former members as Slaves
 Jason Mays – bass (2014)
 Christopher Kim – rhythm guitar, percussion, keyboards (2014–2015, 2016–2018)
 Alex Lyman – lead guitar, backing vocals (2014–2016)
 Tai Wright – drums, percussion (2014–2016)
 Jonny Craig – lead vocals (2014–2019)

Former touring members 
 Andrew Mena – bass (2014)
 Michael Nordeen – bass (2014)
 Jonathan Wolfe – rhythm and lead guitar (2015)
 Paul Gaul – lead guitar (2016)
 Thomas Michael Joy – rhythm guitar (2016)
 Blake Howard – rhythm and lead guitar (2016–2017)
 Christian Kett – drums (2016)
 Christopher M. Suitt – drums (2016–2017)

 Timeline

Discography as Rain City Drive

Studio albums
 Rain City Drive (2022)

Singles
 "Cutting It Close" (2021)
 "Dreams" (2022)
 “Waiting On You" (2022)
 “Dying For" (2022)

Videography

Discography as Slaves

Studio albums

 Through Art We Are All Equals (2014)
 Routine Breathing (2015)
 Beautiful Death (2018)
 To Better Days (2020)

Extended plays
 Revision (2019)

Singles
 "The Fire Down Below"
 "The Upgrade, Pt. II"
 "Starving for Friends" (featuring Vic Fuentes)
 "My Soul Is Empty And Full of White Girls"
 "Burning Our Morals Away"
 "Death Never Lets Us Say Goodbye"
 "Drowning In My Addiction"
 "Running Through The 6 With My Soul"
 "I'd Rather See Your Star Explode"
 "True Colors"
 "Patience Is The Virtue"
 "I Know A Lot Of Artists"
 "The Pact"
 "Body On Fire"
 "Heavier"
 "Prayers"
 "Bury A Lie"
 "Talk to a Friend"
 "Wasting My Youth"
 "Like I Do"
 "Eye Opener"

Videography

References

External links
 Slaves First Single 

Musical groups from Sacramento, California
Rock music groups from California
Name changes due to the George Floyd protests